The 1948–49 season was Fussball Club Basel 1893's 55th season in their existence. It was their third season in the top flight of Swiss football after their promotion from the Nationalliga B during the season 1945–46. Basel played their home games in the Landhof, in the Quarter Kleinbasel. Jules Düblin was the club's chairman for the third successive season.

Overview 
Ernst Hufschmid who had functioned as player-coach the previous season continued in the function as manager this season. Basel played a total of 36 games in this season. Of these 26 in the Nationalliga A, four in the Swiss Cup and six were test games. The test games resulted with two victories, three draws and one defeats. In total, including the test games and the cup competition, they won 17 games, drew 11 and lost eight times. In the 36 games they scored 75 goals and conceded 49.

There were fourteen teams contesting in the 1948–49 Nationalliga A, the bottom two teams in the table to be relegated. The team started the season badly, losing three of the first four away games. Things changed in Autumn and they lost only one of the following eleven matches and they climbed to the upper end of the table. At the end of the season Basel had risen to second position, but were seven points behind the new champions Lugano. Basel won 13 of the 26 games and were defeated six times, they scored 58 goals as they gained their 33 points. Hans Hügi was the team's top goal scorer with 14 goals, his brother Josef Hügi (Seppe) scored eight and Gottlieb Stäuble netted nine times.

In the Swiss Cup Basel started in round 3 with an away match against lower tier Winterthur, which was won 2–1. In round 4 Basel were drawn with an away tie against local rivals and lower tier Concordia Basel. In round five Basel were matched against Grasshopper Club with another away game. This was drawn and a replay was required, which was held at the Landhof on 22 January 1949, but ended with a defeat.

Players 
The following is the list of the Basel first team squad during the season 1948–49. The list includes players that were in the squad on the day that the Nationalliga A season started on 29 August 1948 but subsequently left the club after that date.

 
 

 

 
 

 
 

Players who left the squad

Results

Legend

Friendly matches

Pre and mid-season

Nationalliga

League matches

League standings

Swiss Cup

See also
 History of FC Basel
 List of FC Basel players
 List of FC Basel seasons

References

Sources 
 Rotblau: Jahrbuch Saison 2014/2015. Publisher: FC Basel Marketing AG. 
 Die ersten 125 Jahre. Publisher: Josef Zindel im Friedrich Reinhardt Verlag, Basel. 
 The FCB team 1948–49 at fcb-archiv.ch
 Switzerland 1948–49 by Erik Garin at Rec.Sport.Soccer Statistics Foundation

External links
 FC Basel official site

FC Basel seasons
Basel